Bizarre, Bizarre is a 1937 French comedy film directed by Marcel Carné. It is based on the 1912 novel His First Offence by J. Storer Clouston.

Plot
At a meeting in London, Bishop Soper denounces scandalous literature, in particular the latest crime novel from Felix Chapel. An invited member of the sparse audience is his cousin Irwin Molyneux, who is asked to speak but is interrupted by William Kramps, a serial murderer of butchers who is on the run. After the meeting ends in uproar, Soper invites himself to dine and sleep at the Molyneux house.

This throws Mrs Molyneux into confusion, as her servants have just left her and she, pretending to be called away, cooks the meal while the secretary Eva serves it. Soper finds Molyneux's feeble excuses for his wife's absence bizarre and, once he has gone to bed, Mr and Mrs Molyneux flee to a boarding house in Chinatown, unaware that the next room houses William Kramps. In the morning, finding both now gone, Soper rings Scotland Yard.

All London is intrigued by the mystery and a newspaper hires the noted crime writer, Felix Chapel, to investigate. This is Mr Molyneux in a false beard, but he has no idea how to construct a mystery because his plots all come from Eva. She confesses that she is equally clueless, since she gets them from the milkman Billy, who is in love with her.

While he is in his own house searching for clues to his wife's disappearance, back in Chinatown she has caught the attention of William Kramps, who woos her with flowers and flattery. When Molyneux arrives and reveals to Kramps that he is the writer Felix Chapel, while the lady is the missing Mrs Molyneux, the two men get happily drunk together and go back to the Molyneux house.

There they find Soper disguised as a Scottish soldier, trying to find an incriminating signed photo of a showgirl that he fears he left there, and a sleeping police detective. An angry crowd has gathered outside, wanting to hang the bishop for the murder of Mrs Molyneux. She slips in through the garden, to find William Kramps sleeping off his binge naked beside the pond. Going inside, her husband advises her to hide in a closet for safety. The sleeping detective, who also was drunk, wakes up to say that the body was revealed to him in a dream and, opening the closet, finds Mrs Molyneux.

William Kramps comes in to say he has killed Mr Molyneux and is arrested, but assures Mrs Molyneux he will escape. Mr Molyneux decides to stay as Felix Chapel, because it is better paid and more fun.

Cast
Michel Simon as Irwin Molyneux, botany professor, alias Félix Chapel, crime writer
Françoise Rosay as Margaret Molyneux, his wife
Louis Jouvet as Archibald Soper, bishop of Bedford, his cousin
 as Eva, his secretary
Jean-Pierre Aumont as Billy, the milkman in love with Eva
Jean-Louis Barrault as William Kramps, the murderer of butchers
Pierre Alcover as Inspector Bray of Scotland Yard

References

External links

French black-and-white films
1937 comedy films
French comedy films
Films based on British novels
Films directed by Marcel Carné
Films set in London
Films set in the 1900s
Films with screenplays by Jacques Prévert
1930s French-language films
1930s French films